The Satvara are a Hindu caste found in the state of Gujarat in India.

History 
There are several traditions as to the origin of the Satvara community. According to one such tradition, they are descended from a Rajput who took a Kurmi wife and then left North India for Saurashtra, who escaped the wrath of the Hindu god  Parshurama by abandoning the Kshatriya custom of being warriors and took to farming. They are found mainly in north Gujarat, Saurashtra and Kutch. They speak Gujarati and Kutchi.

Present circumstances 
The Sathwara are found mainly in the districts of Jamnagar, Bhavnagar, Surendranagar district, and Junagadh. They have two main divisions, based on dietary habits, the vegetarian and non-vegetarian, and each section is endogamous. The North Gujarat Sathwara are further divided into territorial divisions, the Dandariya group found in Sabarkantha, Aravalli and Patanwadia found in Mehsana District. They are further divided into exogamous clans, the main ones being the Hadiyal, Parmar, Sonagra, Nakum, Kacchatiya, Kanzariya, Maghodiya 

Chopda, Khandar, Kadiya, Bedia, Mori and Dabhi. They are constituents of the ther-tasidi group of Hindu castes, that interdine.
The Sathwara are a number of quasi-Rajput groups found in Gujarat, like the Khant and, have similar customs. Traditionally, they were farmers, but are now engaged in diverse occupations such as masonry. However, the majority of the community remain farmers. They are Hindu, and are followers of Mahadev.

See also 
 Khantsathwara also known as "fulmali" live in rajsthan.

References 

Social groups of Gujarat
Indian castes
Tribal communities of Gujarat